Scholar's Aid is a shareware reference management software package. The project seems to idle. There have been no updates since September 2010.

Structure

Scholar's Aid program package includes a bibliographical data manager called Library, an importing/exporting manager called DataRetriever, and a notes/information manager called Notes.

Operation

Library manages bibliographical data drawn from a wide range of sources (books, articles, Internet web sites, etc.) and generates the common forms of citations (i.e., footnotes, endnotes, etc.) and bibliographies. The format of the resulting reference can conform to one of the standard styles (e.g., Chicago, APA, etc.) or to a style designed by users to meet their own specific requirements.

Notes manages quotes, notes, web pages, and other information in a hierarchical structure. Each note can be linked to its source in the Library module in such a way that, when a user transfers any text from the note into a word processing program, Notes automatically makes a citation with the text transferred in the open document.

DataRetriever transforms external data such as z39.50 data to Scholar's Aid data and exports Scholar's Aid data as various formats such as XML and plain text.

Issues

DataRetriever works with Windows Vista & Windows7.

Scholar's Aid, which has no Windows7 version, is probably incompatible with Windows7. However it can be installed (along with a companion file of updates) and run in the XP mode that can be downloaded for free from Microsoft and added to Windows 7 Professional, Enterprise, or Ultimate editions.

See also

Reference management software